Diego Hernández Jiménez (born 13 August 1999) is a Mexican professional footballer who plays as a winger.

International career
In April 2019, Hernández was included in the 21-player squad to represent Mexico at the U-20 World Cup in Poland.

References

External links

1999 births
Living people
Mexican footballers
Association football midfielders
C.D. Guadalajara footballers
Atlético San Luis footballers
Liga MX players
Footballers from Guadalajara, Jalisco
Mexico under-20 international footballers